Carniella krakatauensis is a species of comb-footed spider in the family Theridiidae. It is found in Krakatau.

References

Theridiidae
Spiders described in 1995
Spiders of Indonesia